Nawalgarh may refer to:
Nawalgarh, Rajasthan, India
Nawalgarh, former name of Nalagarh, Himachal Pradesh, India